More Than Meets the Eye may refer to:

More Than Meets the Eye (album), an album by EliZe
More Than Meets the Eye (EP), an EP by Napalm Death, or the title song
"More Than Meets the Eye" (song), a song by Europe
"More Than Meets the Eye", a song by Testament from The Formation of Damnation
"More Than Meets the Eye", a three-part episode of the American TV series The Transformers
Transformers: More Than Meets the Eye, a 2003 Transformers comics series
The Transformers: More Than Meets the Eye, a 2012 Transformers comics series